André Jules Henri Six (15 July 1879 in Lambersart – 1 April 1915 in Chelles) was a French swimmer and Olympic medalist. He competed at the 1900 Olympic Games in Paris, where he received a silver medal in underwater swimming. He was killed in action during World War I.

See also
 List of Olympians killed in World War I

References

External links
 

1879 births
1915 deaths
French male swimmers
Olympic swimmers of France
Swimmers at the 1900 Summer Olympics
Olympic silver medalists for France
French military personnel killed in World War I
Medalists at the 1900 Summer Olympics
Olympic silver medalists in swimming
People from Lambersart
Sportspeople from Nord (French department)